Gerstaeckeria is a genus of cactus weevils in the beetle family Curculionidae. There are more than 40 described species in Gerstaeckeria.

Species
These 47 species belong to the genus Gerstaeckeria:

 Gerstaeckeria alternata Pierce, 1912
 Gerstaeckeria barringtonensis Van Dyke, 1953
 Gerstaeckeria basalis (LeConte, 1876)
 Gerstaeckeria bifasciata Champion, 1905
 Gerstaeckeria cactophaga Pierce, 1912
 Gerstaeckeria clathrata Pierce, 1912
 Gerstaeckeria crassirostris Hustache, 1930
 Gerstaeckeria cruciata Champion, 1905
 Gerstaeckeria cubaecola Fisher, 1928
 Gerstaeckeria curvilineata Champion, 1910
 Gerstaeckeria dilatata Casey
 Gerstaeckeria doddi Fisher, 1925
 Gerstaeckeria elegans Fisher, 1928
 Gerstaeckeria fasciata Pierce, 1912
 Gerstaeckeria galapagoensis Van Dyke, 1953
 Gerstaeckeria guadelupensis Hustache, 1936
 Gerstaeckeria hoodensis Van Dyke, 1953
 Gerstaeckeria hubbardi (LeConte, 1880)
 Gerstaeckeria indistincta O'Brien, 1970
 Gerstaeckeria inflata Hustache, 1930
 Gerstaeckeria infrequens O'Brien, 1970
 Gerstaeckeria insulana Fisher, 1928
 Gerstaeckeria knullorum (Sleeper, 1954)
 Gerstaeckeria lacti Champion, 1905
 Gerstaeckeria lecontei O'Brien, 1970
 Gerstaeckeria leptocaulis O'Brien, 1970
 Gerstaeckeria leseleuci Champion, 1905
 Gerstaeckeria lineatocollis Champion, 1910
 Gerstaeckeria minuta Hustache, 1930
 Gerstaeckeria mutillaria Champion, 1905
 Gerstaeckeria nobilis (LeConte, 1876)
 Gerstaeckeria obrieni Sleeper, 1971
 Gerstaeckeria opuntiae Pierce, 1912
 Gerstaeckeria parallelus Hustache, 1930
 Gerstaeckeria parvula Hustache, 1930
 Gerstaeckeria peruana O'Brien, 1969
 Gerstaeckeria porosa (LeConte, 1876)
 Gerstaeckeria profusa (Casey, 1892)
 Gerstaeckeria rotundata Hustache, 1930
 Gerstaeckeria semicribatus (Boheman, 1844)
 Gerstaeckeria seymourensis Van Dyke, 1953
 Gerstaeckeria tessellata Pierce, 1912
 Gerstaeckeria tolucana Champion, 1910
 Gerstaeckeria tricolor O'Brien, 1970
 Gerstaeckeria turbida (LeConte, 1876)
 Gerstaeckeria turpis Pierce, 1912
 Gerstaeckeria unicolor Fisher, 1928

References

Further reading

 
 
 

Cryptorhynchinae
Articles created by Qbugbot